Hilary Wilson is a British Egyptologist.

Career
Wilson was an enthusiast of Egyptology since childhood. An alumna of Sutton High School, London, Wilson received her Bachelor's Degree in Combined Studies (mathematics, physics and history, including study of archaeology and medieval history) from the University of Leicester in 1971. She then studied at the University of Exeter and received her Master's Degree from the Open University.

Wilson was an Associate Lecturer in maths and archaeology at the Open University and, from the 1990s, taught Egyptology courses for the University of Southampton Continuing Education Department. She also appeared as "Setkemet, the Egyptian Lady" to introduce primary students to Egyptian history.

Wilson has written several books on Egyptian history, as well as novels set in ancient Egypt (some under the pen name Hilary Cawston, her maiden name). She published many articles for Ancient Egypt magazine and frequently wrote the magazine's "Per Mesut" feature for young readers. She has also published articles in History Today, and the Journal of Egyptian Archaeology

Personal life
Wilson is married to Philip Wilson, emeritus Professor of Ship Dynamics at the University of Southampton. In 1998,their eldest son Richard was graduated from Leicester University, as both his parents had been.

Wilson's brother Timothy Cawston was among the founding faculty of Leicester Grammar School and later became deputy headmaster.

Books

Egyptology
 
Surveys the constituents of the ancient Egyptian diet, with chapters on cereals and their uses, fruit and vegetables, meat, fish and fowl, and condiments.

 
This study seeks to bring to life the craftsmen, labourers and administrators of Ancient Egypt, looking at their religion, education and concept of order based on the family unit.

Dutch translation:  

Polish translation:  

 
 
Teaches how to decipher Egyptian hieroglyphs. Hundreds of the most commonly used hieroglyphs are arranged in tables with translations, plus examples from monuments, ancient documents and museum exhibits. Fully illustrated throughout with line drawings, tables and maps.

The book is divided into ten chapters: "What's in a Name", "Personal Names", "Royalty", "Spirits of Place", "Be a Scribe", "Officialdom", "The Priesthood", "The Servants in the Place of Truth", "Keeping Count", and "Marking Time".
 
Chapter 1 covers the execration texts, as well as the Nine Bows of the Theban tomb of Surer, including Tutankhamun's Nine Bows' clay impression seal of Anubis that sealed his tomb. Chapter 5 ("Be a Scribe") has some introduction to cursive (or linear) hieroglyphs. Chapter 6, "Officialdom", begins by using the scenes from the Scorpion Macehead; the chapter also translates four minor scarab artifacts. The final chapter (10, "Marking Time), translates the famous label of Pharaoh Den and a Middle Egyptian stele of 14 horizontal lines; an offering table scene is translated to end the chapter and book.

French translation: 

German translation: 

Hungarian translation: 

Chinese translation: 

Fiction
 Following the experiences of Nebetiunet - an Egyptian mother and wife living in the holy city of Waset (Thebes) during the fifth year of the reign of Ramesses II - Egyptian Woman offers a fascinating insight into a year in her busy and remarkable life.Described in vivid and accurate detail, Egyptian Woman provides an absorbing fictional account of a year in the life of an exceptional woman in ancient Egypt. – Goodreads

German translation: 
Czech translation: 

As Hilary Cawston, Wilson has self-published the novels Seeking Osiris (2015, 978-1507598139) and The Prince's Spy: a Story of Egypt (2105, 978-1508822363, a detective story based on the ancient Egyptian tale "The Treasure Thief"

References

External links
 

Date of birth missing (living people)
Living people
British Egyptologists
Alumni of the University of Leicester
Alumni of the Open University
Academics of the University of Southampton
British historical novelists
Year of birth missing (living people)